Adventures of the Yellow Suitcase is a 1970 children's film directed by Ilya Frez based on the eponymous story by Sofia Prokofieva.

Plot
In one sunny city live two cute and unusual children; boy Petya and girl Toma. Toma is an "ice queen" because she never smiles and often cries, and Petya is a coward who lacks courage. One day Petya's mom and Toma's dad decide to turn to the doctor. The doctor is unusual, he has candies against fear, and with the help of other sweets he can heal from anger and cunning, stupidity, sadness, lies, gossip.

But, by an incredible coincidence, a suitcase of yellow color with miracle drugs comes into the wrong hands. Under threat are the lives of Toma's grandmother, the pilot Verevkin - Toma's father, the tamer of tigers Bulankin.

Toma's grandmother, doctor, Toma and Petya set off on a quest for the suitcase containing the magic medicines.

Cast
Tatyana Pelttser as Anna Petrovna, Toma's grandmother
Yevgeni Lebedev as children's doctor
 Andrei Gromov as Petya
 Viktoria Chernakova as  Toma
Natalya Seleznyova as Petya's mother  Petya
Boris Bystrov as pilot Veryovkin, Toma's dad
Viktor Tikhonov as Fyodor Bulankin
 Yevgeniy Vesnik as Airport manager
 Konstantin Kuntyshev as foreman

References

External links

Soviet children's films
Russian children's fantasy films
1970s children's adventure films
Films directed by Ilya Frez
1970s children's fantasy films